The Deodoro Aquatics Centre is a swimming venue in Deodoro, Rio de Janeiro, Brazil, that hosted the swimming events in the modern pentathlon at the 2016 Summer Olympics.

References

Sports venues in Rio de Janeiro (city)
Venues of the 2016 Summer Olympics
Olympic modern pentathlon venues
Deodoro Olympic Park